Rosemary Martin (17 December 1936 – 14 August 1998) was an English actress, born in Birmingham. She appeared in dozens of films from 1964 to 1998 and is also known  for television roles including Mrs. Partridge in Last of the Summer Wine, Vera in Oh No It's Selwyn Froggitt, Marjorie in Pennies from Heaven, Miss Weber in The Insurance Man, Renie Fox in Fox and Verna Johnson in Tenko.

Other TV credits include: Z-Cars, Crown Court, Bill Brand, Coronation Street, The Gentle Touch, The Sweeney, Looking For Clancy, Maggie: It's Me, Thomas & Sarah, Bergerac, The Chinese Detective, Jeeves and Wooster, Drop the Dead Donkey, Pie in the Sky, Cracker, Heartbeat, The Bill, Outside Edge, Driving Ambition, Peak Practice and EastEnders. 

Her film credits include It Shouldn't Happen to a Vet (1976), Tess (1979), Britannia Hospital (1982), Slayground (1983), Secret Places (1984), The Dressmaker (1988), The Raggedy Rawney (1988), A Dry White Season (1989) and The Object of Beauty (1991).

Death
Martin died on 14 August 1998.

Filmography

References

External links
 

1936 births
1998 deaths
English film actresses
English television actresses
Place of birth missing
20th-century English actresses